Eoin O'Malley (born 6 July 1988) is an Irish former professional rugby union player for Leinster. O'Malley played as a centre.

Career
O'Malley played rugby for Belvedere College and represented both Leinster schools and Ireland Schools. O'Malley earned 7 caps for the Ireland under-19 and a further 10 for the Ireland under-20's. He played 3 times for the Leinster under-20 side before joining the first team. O'Malley made his first team debut against Newport Gwent Dragons in the Celtic League in December 2009. He has played 7 games for Leinster in the Celtic League and was named on their bench for the 2009-10 Heineken Cup semi-final clash with Stade Toulousain. O'Malley has also made 4 appearances in the British and Irish Cup for Leinster A.
He was forced to retire in the summer of 2013 at the age of 25.

External links
Profile on Leinster Rugby

Notes

1988 births
Living people
People educated at Belvedere College
Leinster Rugby players
Irish rugby union players
Rugby union centres
Rugby union players from Dublin (city)